The 1994–95 CD Guadalajara season is the 88th season in the football club's history and the 51st consecutive season in the top flight division of Mexican football.

Summary
In summertime Salvador Martinez Garza (a known oligarch of then-President Carlos Salinas de Gortari and Texaco distributor) in his 2nd campaign as Chairman  reinforced the squad with left winger Ramon Ramirez, Forward Daniel Guzman  and left-back defender Camilo Romero. In his second campaign as head coach Alberto Guerra after the collapse of "Super Chivas" the last season, improved the defensive line and aimed by superb features in midfield by Ramon Ramirez and Coyote plus the goals scored by Missael Espinosa and Guzman allowed the club to reach the 1st place in regular season the best campaign since the championship won in 1987. In league post-season, the team defeated Santos Laguna in quarterfinals reaching in fact the next phase for the first time since de 1990-91 Playoff. 

However, the squad was eliminated in semifinals by Necaxa despite of being heavy-favourite to reach the Final prompting the end of Alberto Guerra tenure as manager for the next season.

Squad

Transfers

Winter

Competitions

La Liga

League table

Group 1

General table

Results by round

Matches

Statistics

Players statistics

References

External links

C.D. Guadalajara seasons
1994–95 Mexican Primera División season
1994–95 in Mexican football